Heracleitus or Heraclitus may refer to:

Philosophers
Heraclitus of Ephesus, pre-Socratic Ionian philosopher
Heraclitus (commentator) (Heraclitus Homericus), commentator on Homer
Heraclitus of Sicyon, author on stones
Heraclitus of Tyre, friend of Antiochus
Heraclitus the paradoxographer, rationalizing author on Greek mythology
Heraclitus the Peripatetic

Poets
Heraclitus (comic poet)
Heraclitus (lyric poet)
Heraclitus of Halicarnassus, elegiac poet

Athletes
Heraclitus of Macedon, winner in stadion Lykaia 304 BC
Heraclitus of Samos, winner in stadion Olympics 208 BC

Other
Heraclitus of Cyme in Aeolis, governor of Heraclea appointed by Arsinoe II
Heraclitus of Lesbos, historian on Macedon
Heraclitus of Tarentum, harpist of Alexander
"Heraclitus", poem by William Johnson Cory, modelled on a poem by Callimachus
Heraclitus (crater), a complex lunar impact crater in the rugged southern highlands of the Moon
Heraclitus (modeling infrastructure), an approach for modeling computer-integrated systems
Heraclitus (ship), a vessel built by Institute of Ecotechnics as one of several prequels to Project Biosphere 2

Notes

References
Dictionary of Greek and Roman Biography and Mythology
Heracleitus, AncientLibrary.com

Greek masculine given names